Northern Electricity Supply Company Limited commonly known as NESCO is a state owned utility and electricity company in Bangladesh and is located in Rajshahi, Bangladesh.

History
North West Zone Power Distribution Company Limited was established in October 2016 by breaking up different distribution network of Bangladesh Power Development Board. It is responsible for the distribution of electricity in Rajshahi Division and Rangpur Division. The plan to create the company was formed in 2003 nut was delayed by opposition from staff at Bangladesh Power Development Board. When the company was being formed some employees of Bangladesh Power Development Board vandalized the office of the chairman of the board.

Northern Electricity Supply Company Limited was established in August 2005. It was established as a public limited company under the Companies Act, 1994. The company took over the North West Zone of Bangladesh Power Development Board which contained Rajshahi Division and Rangpur Division on 1 October 2016.

References

Government-owned companies of Bangladesh
2005 establishments in Bangladesh
Electric power companies of Bangladesh
Organisations based in Rajshahi
Electric power distribution network operators
Bangladeshi companies established in 2005